French shipbuilding firm Ocea has designed and sold fast patrol boat it calls the Ocea FPB 72.
 it has delivered FPB 72 vessels to Suriname, Nigeria and the Philippines.

Design

They can be armed with machine guns, or an autocannon.

Nigerian Navy

Seven Ocea FPB 72 vessels were delivered to the Nigerian Navy.

Suriname Coast Guard

In November 2012 the defence and internal affairs Ministry of Suriname bought three patrol vessels from the French company Ocea for the Coast Guard. This order was worth 16 million euros. These patrol vessels will be used for fishery protection and to counterattack piracy in Surinamese waters. The first Fast Patrol Boat (P201), a Ocea FPB 98 type, was delivered in June 2013. The first boat arrived in Paramaribo with a container vessel from the port of Saint-Nazaire, France. Delivery of the remaining two vessels (P101 & P102), FPB 72 types, occurred by the end of July, 2013.

Philippine Coast Guard

On September 9, 2014, the Philippine Coast Guard (PCG) through the Department of Transportation (DOTr) and the French Shipbuilder OCEA entered an agreement to supply the latter with four 24 m FPB-72 Patrol Boats and one  OPV-270 Offshore Patrol Vessel provided by a loan granted by the French Government.

The first of the four FPB-72, BRP Boracay arrived at the Alava Pier in Subic, Philippines on August 8, 2018 while the second boat, BRP Panglao arrived on September 3. Both Boracay and Panglao were commissioned together during the PCG anniversary celebration on October 17, 2018.

BRP Malamawi, the third boat out of four, was launched in July 2018 and is expected to be delivered by November 2018. The fourth and last FPB-72 Patrol Boat for the Philippine Coast Guard, BRP Kalanggaman was launched August 13, 2018 and is expected to be delivered by January 2019.

References

Patrol boat classes
Ships built in France